This is a list of electoral division results for the Australian 1946 federal election.

Overall
This section is an excerpt from 1946 Australian federal election § House of Representatives

New South Wales

Barton 
This section is an excerpt from Electoral results for the Division of Barton § 1946

Calare 
This section is an excerpt from Electoral results for the Division of Calare § 1946

Cook 
This section is an excerpt from Electoral results for the Division of Cook (1906–1955) § 1946

Cowper 
This section is an excerpt from Electoral results for the Division of Cowper § 1946

Dalley 
This section is an excerpt from Electoral results for the Division of Dalley § 1946

Darling 
This section is an excerpt from Electoral results for the Division of Darling § 1946

East Sydney 
This section is an excerpt from Electoral results for the Division of East Sydney § 1946

Eden-Monaro 
This section is an excerpt from Electoral results for the Division of Eden-Monaro § 1946

Gwydir 
This section is an excerpt from Electoral results for the Division of Gwydir § 1946

Hume 
This section is an excerpt from Electoral results for the Division of Hume § 1946

Hunter 
This section is an excerpt from Electoral results for the Division of Hunter § 1946

Lang 
This section is an excerpt from Electoral results for the Division of Lang § 1946

Macquarie 
This section is an excerpt from Electoral results for the Division of Macquarie § 1946

Martin 
This section is an excerpt from Electoral results for the Division of Martin § 1946

New England 
This section is an excerpt from Electoral results for the Division of New England § 1946

Newcastle 
This section is an excerpt from Electoral results for the Division of Newcastle § 1946

North Sydney 
This section is an excerpt from Electoral results for the Division of North Sydney § 1946

Parkes 
This section is an excerpt from Electoral results for the Division of Parkes (1901–1969) § 1946

Parramatta 
This section is an excerpt from Electoral results for the Division of Parramatta § 1946

Reid
This section is an excerpt from Electoral results for the Division of Reid § 1946

Richmond 
This section is an excerpt from Electoral results for the Division of Richmond § 1946

Riverina 
This section is an excerpt from Electoral results for the Division of Riverina § 1946

Robertson 
This section is an excerpt from Electoral results for the Division of Robertson § 1946

Warringah 
This section is an excerpt from Electoral results for the Division of Warringah § 1946

Watson 
This section is an excerpt from Electoral results for the Division of Watson (1934–1969) § 1946

Wentworth 
This section is an excerpt from Electoral results for the Division of Wentworth § 1946

Werriwa 
This section is an excerpt from Electoral results for the Division of Werriwa § 1946

West Sydney 
This section is an excerpt from Electoral results for the Division of West Sydney § 1946

Victoria

Balaclava 
This section is an excerpt from Electoral results for the Division of Balaclava § 1946

Ballaarat 
This section is an excerpt from Electoral results for the Division of Ballarat § 1946

Batman 
This section is an excerpt from Electoral results for the Division of Batman § 1946

Bendigo 
This section is an excerpt from Electoral results for the Division of Bendigo § 1946

Bourke 
This section is an excerpt from Electoral results for the Division of Bourke § 1946

Corangamite 
This section is an excerpt from Electoral results for the Division of Corangamite § 1946

Corio 
This section is an excerpt from Electoral results for the Division of Corio § 1946

Deakin 
This section is an excerpt from Electoral results for the Division of Deakin § 1946

Fawkner 
This section is an excerpt from Electoral results for the Division of Fawkner § 1946

Flinders 
This section is an excerpt from Electoral results for the Division of Flinders § 1946

Gippsland 
This section is an excerpt from Electoral results for the Division of Gippsland § 1946

Henty 
This section is an excerpt from Electoral results for the Division of Henty § 1946

Indi 
This section is an excerpt from Electoral results for the Division of Indi § 1946

Kooyong 
This section is an excerpt from Electoral results for the Division of Kooyong § 1946

Maribyrnong 
This section is an excerpt from Electoral results for the Division of Maribyrnong § 1946

Melbourne 
This section is an excerpt from Electoral results for the Division of Melbourne § 1946

Melbourne Ports 
This section is an excerpt from Electoral results for the Division of Melbourne Ports § 1946

Wannon 
This section is an excerpt from Electoral results for the Division of Wannon § 1946

Wimmera 
This section is an excerpt from Electoral results for the Division of Wimmera § 1946

Yarra 
This section is an excerpt from Electoral results for the Division of Yarra § 1946

Queensland

Brisbane 
This section is an excerpt from Electoral results for the Division of Brisbane § 1946

Capricornia 
This section is an excerpt from Electoral results for the Division of Capricornia § 1946

Darling Downs 
This section is an excerpt from Electoral results for the Division of Darling Downs § 1946

Griffith 
This section is an excerpt from Electoral results for the Division of Griffith § 1946

Herbert 
This section is an excerpt from Electoral results for the Division of Herbert § 1946

Kennedy 
This section is an excerpt from Electoral results for the Division of Kennedy § 1946

Lilley 
This section is an excerpt from Electoral results for the Division of Lilley § 1946

Maranoa 
This section is an excerpt from Electoral results for the Division of Maranoa § 1946

Moreton 
This section is an excerpt from Electoral results for the Division of Moreton § 1946

Wide Bay 
This section is an excerpt from Electoral results for the Division of Wide Bay § 1946

South Australia

Adelaide 
This section is an excerpt from Electoral results for the Division of Adelaide § 1946

Barker 
This section is an excerpt from Electoral results for the Division of Barker § 1946

Boothby 
This section is an excerpt from Electoral results for the Division of Boothby § 1946

Grey 
This section is an excerpt from Electoral results for the Division of Grey § 1946

Hindmarsh 
This section is an excerpt from Electoral results for the Division of Hindmarsh § 1946

Wakefield 
This section is an excerpt from Electoral results for the Division of Wakefield § 1946

Western Australia

Forrest 
This section is an excerpt from Electoral results for the Division of Forrest § 1946

Fremantle 
This section is an excerpt from Electoral results for the Division of Fremantle § 1946

Kalgoorlie 
This section is an excerpt from Electoral results for the Division of Kalgoorlie § 1946

Perth 
This section is an excerpt from Electoral results for the Division of Perth § 1946

Swan 
This section is an excerpt from Electoral results for the Division of Swan § 1946

Tasmania

Bass 
This section is an excerpt from Electoral results for the Division of Bass § 1946

Darwin 
This section is an excerpt from Electoral results for the Division of Darwin § 1946

Denison 
This section is an excerpt from Electoral results for the Division of Denison § 1946

Franklin 
This section is an excerpt from Electoral results for the Division of Franklin § 1946

Wilmot 
This section is an excerpt from Electoral results for the Division of Wilmot § 1946

Northern Territory

Northern Territory 
This section is an excerpt from Electoral results for the Division of Northern Territory § 1946

See also 

 Candidates of the 1946 Australian federal election
 Members of the Australian House of Representatives, 1946–1949

References 

House of Representatives 1946